Old Deerfield School is a historic school in Deerfield Beach, Florida, United States. It is located at 232 North East 2nd Street. Designed by A.E. Lewis it was built by Edgar S. Tubbs in 1920. On May 5, 1999, it was added to the U.S. National Register of Historic Places.

The school is maintained by the Deerfield Beach Historical Society.

References

External links

Deerfield Beach Historical Society
 Broward County listings at National Register of Historic Places
  Florida Division of Historical Resources

Education in Broward County, Florida
Museums in Deerfield Beach, Florida
Education museums in the United States
National Register of Historic Places in Broward County, Florida
Historically segregated African-American schools in Florida
1920 establishments in Florida